The 2020–21 season was the 96th season of competitive football in Poland.

Men's football

League competitions

Ekstraklasa

I liga

II liga

III liga

Group 1

Group 2

Group 3

Group 4

Cup competitions

Polish Cup

Polish SuperCup

UEFA competitions

UEFA Champions League

Qualifying phase and play-off round

First qualifying round

|}

Second qualifying round

|}

UEFA Europa League

Qualifying phase and play-off round

First qualifying round

|}

Second qualifying round

|}

Third qualifying round

|}

Play-off round

|}

Group stage

Group D

UEFA Youth League

Domestic Champions Path

First round

|}

UEFA Women's Champions League

Qualifying rounds

First qualifying round

|}

Second qualifying round

|}

Knockout phase

Round of 32

|}

National teams

Poland national football team

Friendlies

UEFA Nations League

Group 1

UEFA Euro 2020

Group E

2022 FIFA World Cup qualification

Group I

Poland national under-21 football team

Friendlies

2021 UEFA European Under-21 Championship

Qualification

Group 5

Notes

References

 
Football
Football
Poland
Poland